Rupertia physodes is a species of legume known by the common names forest scurfpea and California tea.

It is native to west coast and coastal mountains of California, and northwards through the Cascade Range into Idaho and British Columbia.

Description
Rupertia physodes is a low bushy perennial with often recumbent branches that may form a dense ground cover. It has deep, woody roots and grows well on the dry edges of woods and prairies where it flowers in late spring and summer when few other nectar sources remain available.

It has trifoliate leaves with three dark green tear-shaped entire leaflets which are smooth overall to sparsely hairy along the veins.

The individual papilionaceous (pea-like) flowers are white to cream colored, tinged with green or purple when freshly opened and fading to a rusty brown. A notable characteristic of this species is that the calyx continues to grow after the flower is shed and it soon becomes much longer than the developing seed pod, forming a large expanded conical collar around the one-seeded pod.

The mature bracts have a light resinous aromatic odor reminiscent of hops.

References

External links
Jepson Manual Treatment for Rupertia physodes
USDA Plants Profile of Rupertia physodes
Rupertia physodes — U.C. Photo gallery

Psoraleeae
Flora of California
Flora of British Columbia
Flora of Idaho
Flora of Oregon
Flora of Washington (state)
Flora of the Cascade Range
Flora of the Klamath Mountains
Natural history of the California chaparral and woodlands
Natural history of the California Coast Ranges
Natural history of the Transverse Ranges
Natural history of the San Francisco Bay Area
Natural history of the Santa Monica Mountains
Taxa named by James Walter Grimes
Flora without expected TNC conservation status